Kaberi Kachari is a writer, poet, political and economical speaker and the wife of Arabinda Rajkhowa, the chairman of the peace talks process outfit called the United Liberation Front of Assam ULFA. She was known for her poetic excellence from her college days.

Personal life
In the late 80s, when she was a student at the Gauhati University, she married Arabinda Rajkhowa. They had to spend the initial days of their marriage in jungles of Assam and Bhutan. They have two children Khamseng  Rajkumari (Daughter) and Gadadhar (Son).

Arrest
She, along with her husband Rajkhowa, deputy C-in-C Raju Baruah and Rajkhowa's bodyguard Raja Bora were said to be surrendered to the BSF on 4 Dec 2009 morning near the Indo-Bangladesh border in Meghalaya. She was not produced in court for no pending cases were there against her. She and the other women along with their minors are housed in the 4th Assam Police Battalion's guesthouse in Guwahati.

Family custody
Rajkhowa's elder brother Ajay Rajkonwar reportedly told that he wants to take custody of his brother's family so that their 97-year-old mother could meet them. "We are ready to take custody of Kaveri and the two children -- 13-year-old daughter and five-year old son -- and take them to our mother at Lakwa in Sibsagar. If Kaveri wants to stay back for the outfit's organisational work, we have nothing to say," he said to reporters.

See also
List of top leaders of ULFA
Sanjukta Mukti Fouj
Enigma Group

References

Prisoners and detainees from Assam
ULFA members
Living people
Writers from Northeast India
Gauhati University alumni
Poets from Assam
20th-century Indian poets
Women writers from Assam
20th-century Indian women writers
Year of birth missing (living people)